Kaddish is a Jewish prayer.

Kaddish may also refer to:

Places
Kadisha Valley, in Lebanon, also transliterated Kaddish or Qadish

Literature
Kaddish (poem), a 1961 poem by Allen Ginsberg
Kaddish and Other Poems, a 1961 book of poems by Allen Ginsberg
Kadish, a 1998 book by Leon Wieseltier
 Kaddish, a book on the Nazis by Yehiel De-Nur

Film and TV
Kaddish (1924 film), a German silent drama film
Kaddish (2019 film), a Russian film
Kaddish (The X-Files), an X-Files episode

Music

Classical compositions
Kaddish, baroque composition by Salamone Rossi
Kaddish (Poem Op. 6), composition for piano and oboe by Alexander Veprik (1899–1958)
Kaddish (symphony), a symphony by Leonard Bernstein
Kaddish, composition for symphony by Henri Lazarof (1932–2013)
Kaddish, composition for piano and cello by Mark Kopytman (1929–2011)
Kaddish, composition for piano and cello by Joachim Stutschewsky (1891–1982)
Symphony No. 21 (Weinberg) ("Kaddish"), composition by Mieczysław Weinberg (1919–1996)

Albums
Kaddish (Towering Inferno album), 1993
Kaddish (Salem album), 1994

See also
Kadish
Kiddush
Qadesh (disambiguation)